The triathlon competition at the 2007 Pan American Games was held on July 15, 2007 in Rio de Janeiro, Brazil, the fourth time the event had been held at the Pan American Games. The male and female winners qualified directly for the 2008 Summer Olympics in Beijing, China.

Men's competition

Women's competition

References
Results

Pan American Games
2007
Events at the 2007 Pan American Games